Zecchino may refer to:

 Zecchino or sequin, a medieval coin
 Zecchino d'Oro, an Italian music festival
 Ortensio Zecchino, an Italian historian and politician